Iowa State University College of Agriculture and Life Sciences is one of eight colleges of Iowa State University of Science and Technology in Ames, Iowa.

The University was founded in 1858 as the Iowa Agricultural College and Model Farm. On July 4, 1959, the school was renamed "Iowa State University of Science and Technology" and the College of Agriculture became one of five colleges (i.e., College of Agriculture, College of Engineering, College of Home Economics, College of Sciences and Humanities, and College of Veterinary Medicine). In 2007, the College of Agriculture was renamed "College of Agriculture and Life Sciences".

References

Iowa State University colleges